Gluphisia lintneri, the Lintner's gluphisia moth or Lintner's pebble, is a species of moth in the family Notodontidae (the prominents). It was first described by Augustus Radcliffe Grote in 1877 and it is found in North America.

The MONA or Hodges number for Gluphisia lintneri is 7934.

References

Further reading

 
 
 

Notodontidae
Articles created by Qbugbot
Moths described in 1877